The following is a timeline of the history of the city of Hiroshima, Japan.

Prior to 20th century

 587 - The chief temple dates from this time.
 1599 - Hiroshima Castle built.
 1871 - City becomes seat of Hiroshima Prefecture.
 1874 -  founded.
 1887
  founded.
 Population: 84,094.
 1889 - Hiroshima becomes a municipality.
 1892 - Chugoku Shimbun (newspaper) begins publication.
 1894 - San'yō Railway begins operating.

20th century

 1902 -  founded.
 1903 - Population: 113,545.
 1909 - Population: 142,763.
 1912 - Hiroshima Electric Railway begins operating.
 1918 - Rice riot occurs.
 1920 - Toyo Cork Kogyo Co. (later Mazda) in business.
 1929 -  established.
 1945
 August 6: Atomic bombing of Hiroshima by US forces.
 Population: 137,197.
 1947
 Hiroshima Peace Memorial Ceremony begins.
 Shinzo Hamai becomes mayor.
 1949 - Hiroshima University and Hiroshima Stock Exchange established.
 1950
 Hiroshima Toyo Carp baseball team formed.
 Population: 285,712.
 1951 - Chugoku Electric Power Company headquartered in city.
 1954 - Hiroshima Peace Memorial Park established.
 1955
  becomes part of city.
 August: "First World Conference against Atomic and Hydrogen Bombs meets in Hiroshima."
 1958 - Hiroshima reconstruction festival celebrated by the municipality to mark the city's recovery.
 1971 - Hiroshima City Asa Zoological Park founded.
 1974 - Population: 761,240.
 1975 - Takeshi Araki becomes mayor.
 1976 - Hiroshima Botanical Garden opens.
 1978 - Hiroshima Museum of Art established.
 1980 - Hiroshima designated a government ordinance city.
 1985 - Hiroshima International Animation Festival begins.
 1991 - Takashi Hiraoka becomes mayor.
 1992 - Hiroshima Big Arch (stadium) opens.
 1994
 August: Astram Line (public transit) begins operating.
 October: 1994 Asian Games held in Hiroshima.
 1999 - Tadatoshi Akiba becomes mayor.
 2000 - Population: 1,126,282.

21st century

 2010 - Population: 1,173,843.
 2011 - Kazumi Matsui elected mayor.
 2016 - May: US president visits city.

See also
 Hiroshima history
 Timeline of Hiroshima (in Japanese)
 List of mayors of Hiroshima

References

This article incorporates information from the Japanese Wikipedia.

Bibliography

External links

 
 
 Map of Hiroshima, 1945
 Items related to Hiroshima, various dates (via Europeana).

History of Hiroshima
History of Hiroshima Prefecture
Hiroshima
Years in Japan